The sagum was a garment of note generally worn by members of the Roman military during both the Republic and early Empire.  Regarded symbolically as one of war by the same tradition which embraced the toga as a garment of peace, it was slightly more practical, consisting of a simple rectangular segment of cloth fastened by a leather or metal clasp and worn on top of the armor. The fabric was unwashed wool, saturated with lanolin (which made it water-resistant); it was traditionally dyed bright red.

Notes

Military history of ancient Rome
Roman-era clothing
Robes and cloaks